Vagn Bangsborg (born 28 May 1936) is a former Danish cyclist. He competed in the team time trial at the 1960 Summer Olympics.

References

External links
 

1936 births
Living people
Danish male cyclists
Olympic cyclists of Denmark
Cyclists at the 1960 Summer Olympics
People from Slagelse
Sportspeople from Region Zealand